is a Japanese actor, tarento, and former idol singer.

Tagawa is a resident of Chōfu, Tokyo. He is represented by Sun Music Production.

Tagawa's wife is actress Kumiko Fujiyoshi.

Discography

Singles

Albums

Best album

Filmography

Films

Music, variety programmes

Informal, cultural programmes

TV drama

Radio

Stage

Advertisements

Bibliography

References

External links
 
Genki ni naru! Taiwan: Shira rezaru Shin Kita no Miryoku 

Japanese male actors
Japanese television personalities
Japanese idols
Actors from Kyoto Prefecture
1959 births
Living people